Marcel Manoël was the president of the National Council of the Reformed Church in France from his election in 2001 until his retirement in 2010.

Early life and education
He was born in 1945 in Saint-Jean-du-Gard. He is married to Christiane Manen, teacher. They have three children and five grandchildren.
He studied theology in Montpellier, Lausanne and Geneva.

Ministry
Marcel Manoël was a pastor in Brazzaville and a teacher at the École pastorale du Congo (1968–1972). Nominated pastor in Nancy (1972–1973), pastor in Bangui, Central African Republic (1973–1977). Pastor in Clermont-Ferrand (1977–1978). President of the Regional Council of the Reformed Church in France for Centre-Alpes-Rhône from 1988–1996. Pastor in Nîmes, Oratoire parish from 1996–2001. He was a member of the National Council of the Reformed Church in France from 1986–1990, co-president of the Comité mixte catholique-Protestant in France from 1992–1998 and is a current member of the central committee of the World Council of Churches (appointed 1998).

References

External links 
  Letter addressed by Marcel Manoël to the president of France on the occasion of the debate about national identity (December 2009).

French Calvinist and Reformed ministers
Living people
Year of birth missing (living people)